The 501e Régiment de chars de combat 501e RCC in French, (501e R.C.C, or 501st Combat Tank Regiment) is an armoured tank unit of the French Army created on 13 May 1918, and which took part in the two world wars, the Russian Civil War, the Indochina war, and the Algerian war.

The regiment participated to the campaigns of Free France, then the liberation of Europe at the corps of the 2nd Armoured Division 2e DB of général Philippe François Marie Leclerc de Hauteclocque.

Merged with the 503e Régiment de chars de combat 503e RCC to form the 501e-503e Régiment de chars de combat 501e-503e RCC, the regiment was redesignated as 501e RCC on 23 June 2009.

Creation and different nominations 
 1916 : creation of the assault artillery.
 1918 : creation of the 501st Special Artillery Regiment.
 1920 : became the 501e régiment de chars de combat 501e RCC.
 1939 : the regiment became the 501st Tank Battalion Group.
 1940 : dissolution of GBC
 1940 : 1st Tank company of Free France.
 1943 : creation of the 501e RCC.
 1944 : merged with the 503e RCC, was designated as 501e-503e RCC.
 2009 : dissolution of GE 503, regiment redesignated as 501e RCC.

History

World War I

On 16 April 1917, 132 Schneider CA1 mounted an assault on Berry-au-Bac. Considered the first mounted tank assault in times. From this tank groupment, the 501st Assault Artillery Regiment was created on 20 May 1918.

the 501e RAS, designated RCC, would be the first unit formed with the new organization of the armoured troops in the beginning of 1918.

Initially composed of the first Groupment of Schneider tanks and of the 1st and 2nd battalions of light tanks, (the 1er and 2e BCL), created respectively on 19 February and 18 March 1918 and equipped with Renault FT.
the 3rd battalion, formed on 27 March, was initially assigned to the 508e Régiment de chars de combat 508e RCC then transferred to the 501e RCC since 29 May 1918.

Each light tank battalion was composed of three companies numbered from the 301.

Interwar period 
The 501e was engaged in outre-mer at the corps of the army of the Orient. The 303rd Company of the 501st supported French and Greek forces around Odesa and Kherson, where they fought Nikifor Hryhorev's partisans. On 13 May 1920 the 501 was designated as the 501e Régiment de chars de combat.

World War II 
With the outbreak of the World War II, the regiment formed four combat tank battalions: the 1e and 2e BCC were respectively issued from the 1st and 2nd battalions of the 501e RCC and each comprised 45 Renault R35 tanks while the 30e and 31e BCC were respectively formed and equipped of 63 FT tanks from the reserves. While the 1e, 2e and 31e BCC remained at the corps of GBC 501 and were assigned to the Vth Army, the 30e BCC joined the GBC 502 of the IIIrd Army. These companies were engaged individually.

With the 342e autonomous company back from Narvik out of which a dozen of volunteers joined the Free France, the 1st autonomous tank company of Free France was formed.

The company later served within the ranks of the VIIIth British Army, equipped with British combat Crusader tank. This company was part of the "colonne volante" with the 1st Spahi Regiment.

Two other companies created in 1940 and 1941 merged then with the later to constitute a regiment (the regiment was articulated accordingly into four combat companies).

After having joined the United Kingdom with the 2nd Armoured Division 2e DB, in April 1944, the 501e embarked on August 3 to the Bancs de Grande Vey, on the north-east coast of Carentan. The regiment partook in the liberation of Paris, the tank battle of Dompaire, then Strasbourg and finished the events of campaign series engagements on 5 May 1945. The American command awarded the regiment, the « U.S. Presidential Unit Citation ».

1945 to present 
Formed on 1 September 1945, a marching company embarked for Indochina.

The regiment was engaged in Central Europe, Senegal (1982), Lebanon (1984), Central African Republic (since 1985) and Yugoslavia.

On 1 September 1990 the chef d'état major de l'armée de terre CEMAT, created from the 4e Régiment de dragons 4e RD and the 503e Régiment de chars de combat, a regiment composed of 80 Leclerc tanks in two squadron groups (GE).

On 31 August 1994 the 501e Régiment de chars de combat was dissolved. Simultaneously, the squadron group of the 4e RD was designated squadron group 501. This evolution was remarked in the order of battle of the French Army, the 501e-503e Régiment de chars de combat.

On 23 June 2009 the 503 GE was dissolved and formed a fourth combat squadron in the corps of the 501e which became the 501e RCC. Accordingly, the regiment was integrated at the corps of the 2nd Armoured Brigade 2e BB.

Traditions

Insignia

Regimental Colors

Regimental Song 
Dans le vent, la pluie et l'orage
Chevaux de fer monstres d'aciers canons pointés
Meilleur des chars toujours avec courage
Marche au combat sous les rafales avec fierté

Au 501 soyons toujours fidèles
De la DB les cœurs plus valeureux
Faisant flotter cette devise belle
Nous resterons toujours fiers et heureux

Prends garde aussi devant sa lunette
Un jour tu passe il restera trois secondes
Pour qu'a jamais ta propre vie s'arrête
Le béret noir t'envoie dans l'autre monde

L'éternité te sera moins pénible
Tu te diras ce n'est pas le hasard
C'est sans retour si l'on devient la cible
Du 501 toujours premier des chars

Au baroud après la bagarre
Si tu reviens avant de partir au pays
Tête levée pense à ton étendard
Car son serment d'Afrique n'a plus jamais trahi

Pense à celui qui reste sur la piste
Dans la fournaise le cœur dans sa tourelle
S'en est allé la haut vers les tankistes
Pour que la vie soit ici moins cruelle

Decorations 
The regimental colors of the 501e RCC are decorated with:

 Croix de guerre 1914–1918 with :
 2 palms titled to the 1st Light Tank Battalion of the 501st Special Artillery Regiment
 Croix de guerre 1939–1945 with:
 2 palms
 Croix de la Libération.

Fourragere:
 The regiment is entitled to bear wearing the fourragere with colors of the Croix de guerre 1914–1918 with olive colors of the Croix de guerre 1939–1945 and colors of the Croix de la Libération.

In 1939, six companies were entitled to wear the fourragere with colors of the Croix de Guerre 1914–1918. In total, 15 palms were awarded to six companies.
Three companies of the 3rd battalion of the 501e RCC were awarded the fourragere cited at the orders of the Médaille militaire for four citations at the orders of the armed forces.

Honours

Battle Honours 

Aisne (1918)
Soissonnais (1918)
Champagne (1918)
Belgique (1918)
El-Alamein (1942)
Paris (1944)
Strasbourg (1944)

Regimental Commanders

See also 
31st Brigade

References

Bibliographies
 Général Serge Andolenko, Recueil d'historique de l'arme blindée et de la cavalerie, Paris, Eurimprim, 1968.
 Adrien Bélanger, Auteur en autoédition - , 344 pages A5 - dépôt légal de septembre 2005 - Pour aller délivrer mes frères - Louis Michard (Chamblet, Allier [1914]- Grussenheim, Alsace [1945]- Compagnon de la Libération - 501e RCC de la 2e DB).
 501e régiment de chars de combat. Le chemin le plus long Chronique de la compagnie de char de combat du général de Gaulle (1940–1945). (Éditions Maisonneuve & Larose)
 Avec les chars d'assaut Marcel Fourier. Hachette, 1919 (Témoins, p.|308-310)
 Sturmpionier - Passion histoire et militaria guerre 14-18. Au sommaire du numéro 52 (février/mars/avril 2011).

20th-century regiments of France
21st-century regiments of France
Armoured regiments of France
Military units and formations established in 1918